Luis de la Fuente may refer to:
 Luís de la Fuente (bishop) (died 1566), Nicaraguan bishop
 Luis de la Fuente (footballer, born 1914) (1914–1972), Mexican footballer
 Estadio Luis "Pirata" Fuente, Mexican stadium named after the Mexican footballer
 Luis de la Fuente (footballer, born 1961), Spanish footballer